Oroville Union High School District is a public school district in Butte County, California, United States. Schools in the district include Oroville High School, Prospect High School, Ipakanni Early College Charter School, Las Plumas High School, the Oroville Adult Education Career and Technical Center, and a Community Day School.

External links
 

Education in Butte County, California
Oroville, California
School districts in Butte County, California